Thug Luv is a retail mixtape by the American recording artist and Bone Thugs-n-Harmony member Layzie Bone, released on January 25, 2011, on Siccness.net Entertainment. Layzie has stated that he did not know that this project would be released. He also stated that the tracks were recorded years ago, and that these songs are remixes.

Track list
Confirmed by iTunes, Amazon.com, Allmusic and Best Buy.

References

2011 albums
Layzie Bone albums